Depressaria manglisiella is a moth in the family Depressariidae. It was described by Alexandr L. Lvovsky in 1981. It is found in Georgia and Croatia.

References

Moths described in 1981
Depressaria
Moths of Europe
Moths of Asia